Epicrionops is a genus of caecilians in the family Rhinatrematidae. Species in this genus are known from Colombia, Ecuador, Guyana and Peru, and are likely to occur in Venezuela and Brazil.

Species included (as of October 2019):

References

 
Rhinatrematidae
Amphibian genera